The White Mosque (al-Masjid al-Abyad; , HaMisgad HaLavan) is an Ottoman-era mosque in Nazareth, Israel. It is located in Harat Alghama or the "Mosque Quarter" in the centre of Nazareth's Old Market. The mosque's pencil-shaped minaret, cream-coloured walls, and green-coloured trim and dome are an example of the Ottoman architecture that is commonly found throughout the city.

History and ownership
The construction of the mosque was funded by the Egyptian Ottoman ruler Sulayman Pasha al-Adil in the latter half of the eighteenth century and overseen by the high commissioner of Nazareth, Sheikh Abdullah al-Fahoum. It was constructed between 1804 and 1808. Sheikh Abdullah was granted its trusteeship in the form of a waqf; he administered the mosque until his death in 1815. His tomb is located in the mosque's courtyard.

After Sheikh Abdullah's death, the managing of the mosque's affairs were transferred to Sheikh Amin al-Fahoum. Presently, the mosque continues to form part of the al-Fahoum family waqf, which also includes the khan of the pasha on Casa Nova Street. It is administered by one of Sheikh Abdullah's descendants, ʾAtif al-Fahoum.

The White Mosque of Nazareth was erected by Sheikh Abdullah to mark the end of the reign of the former Ottoman governor, Jazzar Pasha, the predecessor to Suleiman Pasha. Sheikh Abdullah chose "white" to symbolize a new era of purity, light, and peace to be enjoyed between the faiths in Nazareth.

Community use
On a regular day, between 100 and 200 people attend noon and afternoon prayer services, while the Friday sermon is attended by 2,000 to 3,000 people.

The mosque serves the Muslim community of Nazareth by offering religious classes for young men and sponsoring the Muslim "scout troop", in which 400 boys and girls aged nine and older participate. It also houses a museum with exhibits that document Nazareth's recent history.

Gallery

See also 
 Islam in Israel

References

Mosques in Nazareth
Ottoman Palestine
19th-century mosques